= City bar in Taganrog =

Historic point in Taganrog, Russia

Coordinates: 47°13′20″N 38°55′6″E

City bar or Schlagbaum in Taganrog (Russian: Городской шлагбаум) was constructed in 1812–1814 in the outskirts of Taganrog (in the end of Petrovskaya street), symbolizing the city limits and also marking the Russian victory over the French army in the Patriotic War of 1812 (Отечественная война 1812 года). Beyond the bar or schlagbaum was endless steppe.

Originally there were two columns featuring the coat of arms of the city and the Russian two-headed eagle. In 1968, one of the pillars was removed because of the street car line and a large amount of car traffic on the main street of Taganrog.

== Views of City bar in Taganrog ==
City bar in Taganrog (photo 1900s).

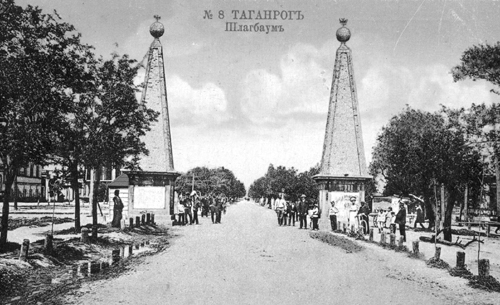
City bar in Taganrog (photo 1900s).

== External links and references ==
- Энциклопедия Таганрога. – Ростов-на-Дону: Ростиздат, 2003
